The Port Theatre is a venue for performing arts, located in Nanaimo, British Columbia. It was built by the Port Theatre Society and the City of Nanaimo, and was officially opened in September 1998. 

The building is located on the waterfront, and houses an 800-seat theatre, several galleries, and offices. 

The venue is home to the Vancouver Island Symphony Orchestra and the professional theatre company TheatreOne.  It also houses the Nanaimo International Jazz Festival, and hosts concerts with local, regional, and international artists.

The Port Theatre won the 2005 Sterling Award for Business Excellence in Arts/Culture/Entertainment from the Nanaimo Chamber of Commerce, and 2004 the Presenter Organization of the Year by the Canadian Arts Presenting Association.

References 

Theatres in British Columbia
Performing arts in Canada
1998 establishments in British Columbia
Buildings and structures in Nanaimo
Music venues in British Columbia